The Conestoga Valley School District is a school district covering East Lampeter Township, Upper Leacock Township and West Earl Township in Lancaster County, Pennsylvania. It is a member of Lancaster-Lebanon Intermediate Unit (IU) 13.  The district operates one High School, one Middle School and four Elementary Schools.

History 
In 1958, East Lampeter Township, Upper Leacock Township, and West Earl township merged their school systems to form the Conestoga Valley School District. Its original high school was dedicated on present-day Smoketown Elementary School as East Lampeter High School. Sometime after 1970, the high school was moved to another location along Horseshoe Road, renamed Conestoga Valley High School, and built completely new while the old building was dedicated as Smoketown Elementary School.

Penn Johns Elementary School 
Located in Bird In Hand, Penn Johns Elementary School was the previous fifth elementary school of Conestoga Valley. It was the last remaining school for the Plain community that over time lost its original purpose and transitioned into a regular elementary school that served all local residents. It was established around 1953 as an Amish and Old Order Mennonite school, but the Amish community no longer attended the school. In 2007, the Conestoga Valley school board voted to close the school for good, citing new teacher certification requirements, operating costs, and new curriculum requirements. The school served around 35 students at the time of closing taught by only two teachers, one for grades 1-4 and one for grades 5-8. The 35 students then matriculated into the four remaining elementary schools.

Recent developments 
For the 2009-2010 school year and beyond, the school board voted to change the school hours of all schools in the district. In previous years, elementary school hours went from 8:20 a.m. to 2:25 p.m. and middle and high school hours went from 7:50 a.m to 3:10 p.m. These hours were changed to 8:50 a.m. to 3:25 p.m. for the elementary schools, 7:35 a.m. to 2:40 p.m. for the middle school, and 7:35 a.m. to 2:45 p.m. for the high school.

For the 2012-2013 school year, Conestoga Valley received a $985,891 state grant to establish two pre-kindergarten classes, expand full-day kindergarten to more students, and added teachers to its ESL program. The grant was part of Pennsylvania's "Keystones to Opportunity" initiative that distributed $36 million to school districts in the state.

Academics
Conestoga Valley School District has been named one of the "Best Communities for Music Education" multiple times by the NAMM Foundation. A survey is made available every year for school districts to fill out, of which schools are selected based on several criteria, including funding, music class participation, instruction time, and facilities. Conestoga Valley has achieved this recognition six times, which required the district to score in the 80th percentile or higher out of all of the other applicants.

Demographical snapshot 

Source: School Newsletter (January 2014)

Schools 
 Conestoga Valley Senior High School (9th-12th), Lancaster
 Conestoga Valley Middle School (7th-8th), Lancaster
 Brownstown Elementary School (K-6th), Brownstown
 J. E. Fritz Elementary School (K-6th), Lancaster
 Leola Elementary School (K-6th), Leola
 Smoketown Elementary School (K-6th), Lancaster

Notable alumni 
Kim Glass is an American indoor volleyball player who joined the U.S. national team in the Olympics and won a silver medal in the 2008 Beijing Olympics.
Jonathan Groff is a singer and stage, television, and film actor who worked in the musical Spring Awakening, voiced Kristoff in the Disney movie Frozen, and starred in television series Glee and Looking.
Floyd Landis is a professional cyclist who won several events including the Tour of California in 2006, and the Tour de France in 2006 of which he was convicted of a doping case.
Kevin Shaffer is an American football offensive tackle who played for the Atlanta Falcons, Cleveland Browns, and Chicago Bears.
Ryan G. Manelick was an American defense contractor who worked in Baghdad, Iraq.

References

School districts in Lancaster County, Pennsylvania
Education in Lancaster, Pennsylvania
School districts established in 1958